Jo Yun-sik (born 24 July 1931) is a South Korean speed skater. He competed in two events at the 1956 Winter Olympics.

References

1931 births
Living people
South Korean male speed skaters
Olympic speed skaters of South Korea
Speed skaters at the 1956 Winter Olympics
Place of birth missing (living people)